Yuki no Kata (ゆきの方) or Oyuki (おゆき), was a Japanese female warrior (onna-musha) in the Sengoku period. She was married to Tomita Nobutaka, an officer of Toyotomi Hideyoshi. Her birth and death are not recorded. Portrayed in current records as beautiful and highly skilled warrior, she defended the Anōtsu castle in the Battle of Sekigahara.

Battle of Anōtsu castle 

Yuki no Kata and Nobutaka sided with Tokugawa Ieyasu from the Eastern Army when Japan was prepared for the Sekigahara campaign.  Nobutaka and his forces were summoned away to aid Ieyasu in punishing Uesugi Kagekatsu as Ishida Mitsunari prepared to attack the western roads towards Edo, Ieyasu's stronghold. The Anōtsu castle was right along the Western Army's path towards Ieyasu, so Yuki no kata took the lead in defending the castle. Since her castle was supposed to be one of the first to be attacked during the campaign, Yuki no kata armed herself, went to the castle walls, and summoned the remaining soldiers to the war.

Upon learning of Mitsunari's movements, Nobutaka rushed back to protect the Anōtsu castle but was delayed by Kuki Yoshitaka. He arrived in time before the western forces led by Mōri Terumoto, Chōsokabe Morichika, and Nabeshima Katsushige reached Anōtsu. Armed with only 1,700 troops, Yuki no Kata and their allies defended themselves against the western alliance force of 30,000; the battle officially began on October 1, 1600.

Although the 1300 defenders put up a stiff defense, the 30,000 attackers largely burned the castle down around them. In the heat of combat, Nobutaka was cut off from his allies in pursuit of an injured enemy officer. To save her husband, Yuki no Kata drove some of the opposing soldiers away using a naginata. So great was her attack that the enemy mistook her for a formal samurai warrior, only one with a face far too fair. Having saved Nobutaka, their forces withdrew back into the castle for the night when negotiations began. Terumoto allowed the defenders to flee at night out of respect for their bravery against such overwhelming odds.

The Tomita clan were rewarded for their loyalty by the Tokugawa shogunate and were given an increase in revenue and rebuilt parts of the castle by the time they were transferred to Uwajima Domain in Iyo Province in 1608. Yuki no Kata is no longer mentioned in historical records after Ieyasu defeated Mitsunari in Sekigahara.

References 

People of Sengoku-period Japan
Women of medieval Japan
Japanese women in warfare
16th-century Japanese people
Women in 16th-century warfare
16th-century Japanese women
17th-century Japanese women
16th-century women rulers
Women in 17th-century warfare